Wolfdale is the code name for a processor from Intel that is sold in varying configurations as Core 2 Duo, Celeron, Pentium and Xeon. In Intel's Tick-Tock cycle, the 2007/2008 "Tick" was Penryn microarchitecture, the shrink of the Core microarchitecture to 45 nanometers as CPUID model 23. This replaced the Conroe processor with Wolfdale.

The Wolfdale chips come in four sizes, with 6 MB and 3 MB L2 cache (Core 2 Duo); the smaller version is commonly called Wolfdale-3M, 2 MB L2 (Pentium), and 1 MB L2 (Celeron).

The mobile version of Wolfdale is Penryn and the dual-socket server version is Wolfdale-DP. The Yorkfield desktop processor is a quad-core Multi-chip module of Wolfdale.

Wolfdale was replaced by Nehalem based Clarkdale and its Sandy Bridge successor.

Variants

Wolfdale 

Wolfdale is the codename for the E8000 series of Core 2 Duo desktop processors and the Xeon 3100 server processor family. Released on January 20, 2008, the chips are manufactured using a 45-nanometer process and feature two processor cores. The Wolfdale models operate at 2.53 GHz, 2.66 GHz, 2.83 GHz, 3.0 GHz, 3.16 GHz, 3.33 GHz, and 3.5 GHz (unreleased Core 2 Duo E8700); the E31x0 and E8xxx series utilizes 6 MB of L2 cache and a 1333 MT/s FSB.  These processors include the SSE4.1 media extensions. Wolfdale uses a product code 80570.

Wolfdale-3M 

Wolfdale-3M is the logical successor of Allendale and uses the 82 mm² dies with 3 MB L2 cache similar to Penryn-3M; its product code is 80571.  It is used in the Core 2 E7xxx series as well as the E5xxx/E6xxx Pentium Dual-Core and E3xxx Celeron processors. The E5xxx enables only 2 MB of L2 cache, replacing the E2xxx series of Pentium Dual core chips; the E7xxx series uses the full 3 MB of L2 Cache, and a 1066MT/s FSB, replacing the Core 2 Duo E4xxx series; and the Celeron E3xxx series with 1 MB L2 cache enabled is the follow-on to the Celeron E1xxx series.

Wolfdale-DP

Wolfdale-CL 

The Xeon L3014 and E3113 processors are Wolfdale-CL with product code 80588, in an LGA 771 package. L3014 has only one core, 3 MB L2 cache and it does not support Intel VT-x, while E3113 is identical to E3110 except that the former fits in an LGA771 socket while the latter fits in LGA775. Both E3113 and E3110 clock to 3Ghz on a 1333Mhz FSB.
The Xeon L3014 and E3113 processors do not fit in LGA 775 based mainboards used by mainstream desktop processors but are typically used in single-socket
LGA 771 blade servers that otherwise require the more expensive DP server processors.
Wolfdale-CL follows an earlier Conroe-CL processor, and Yorkfield-CL
is the respective Quad-Core version of Wolfdale-CL.

Successor 
Wolfdale was replaced by the 45 nm Nehalem processor.

See also 
 Core (microarchitecture)
 Conroe (microprocessor)
 Yorkfield (microprocessor)
 Wolfdale-DP (microprocessor)
 Penryn (microprocessor)
 Lynnfield (microprocessor)
 Celeron
 Pentium Dual-Core
 Intel Core 2
 List of Macintosh models grouped by CPU type

References 

Intel microprocessors